Cardio (from Greek καρδίᾱ kardia, 'heart') may refer to:

 Of the Heart
 Cardiology
 Cardiovascular system 
 Aerobic exercise, also known as cardio
 Cardio (album), a 2010 album by Miguel Bosé

See also
 
 
 Physical exercise